Gare de Fréjus is a railway station serving Fréjus, Var department, southeastern France. It is situated on the Marseille–Ventimiglia railway. The station is served by regional trains (TER Provence-Alpes-Côte d'Azur) to Nice, Marseille and Toulon.

References

Railway stations in Var
Railway stations in France opened in 1863